Qusar District is one of the 66 districts of Azerbaijan. It is located in the north-east of the country and belongs to the Guba-Khachmaz Economic Region. The district borders the districts of Quba, Qabala, Khachmaz, and the Russian Republic of Dagestan. Its capital and largest city is Qusar. As of 2020, the district had a population of 99,000.

Toponymy 
There are several theories about the origin of the word "Qusar". One of them is that the word "qusar" comes from the Russian language, meaning "cavalry warrior". "Qusar" regiment was organized in this territory in 1783–1784. The district was probably named "Qusar" after the name of the regiment.

There is another theory that the word "qusar" derived from an ancient Turkish tribe called "qus/ quz" with the prefix "ar" meaning male.

Abbasgulu Bakikhanov used the word "qusar" in his book Golestan-i Iram to refer to a village.

History 
The earliest sediments in the district belong to the Jurassic Period, 135–145 million years old. It is estimated that life in the Qusar district has been existing since the 2nd millennium B.C. Mahmudtapa, the hills of Monsar, the Govdushan hills, the hills of Hafla belonging to the Bronze Age, the hills of Kyzylgul and Agahan, the Halakhur hills belonging to the Middle Ages are ancient dwellings dating back to the 1st millennium B.C.

The district was originated in 1930 and called Gil District with a centre in Gil village. In 1934, the centre of the district was moved to Qusar, and in 1938 it was renamed Qusar District.

Administrative structure:
 Qullar village
 Urva village

Geography

Qusar is located in Eurasian continent, in the north-eastern inclination of the main Caucasus Mountain ridge. It is located between 41°11’41°45’ latitude North and 47°52’48°41’ longitude East. Mountains, among which is also Shahdagh Mount, take the great part of the rayon. The territory of the rayon occupies the northeastern part of Azerbaijan. Qusar is a unique gate of the republic. Even in ancient times, the territory of the rayon took a good position on a junction of the main trade roads.

The local relief within Qusar district consists of mountains and valleys. Mineral sources such as limestone, chalcopyrite, limonite, and marble are common in the district. Qusar and Samur are main rivers of the Qusar District.

Qusar rayon is located far from sea routes. The most nearest seas to it are the Caspian Sea and the Black Sea. Qusar is the 14th largest rayon in Azerbaijan.

Extreme points of the district are:
 In North – Suduroba
 In South – 
 In East – 
 In West – Bazarduzu summit

Extension of the borders in kilometres:
Dagestan Republic (with Akhtin, Dokuzpara and Mahammadkend rayons) .
Qabala District .
Quba District .
Khachmaz District .

Flora and fauna 
Oak, peanut and hornbeam are often found in the forest areas. Natural herbs such as cranberry, sumac, hawthorn, wild grapes and blackberries are also grown in the forests.

Wolf, fox, bear, boar, mountain goat and rabbit are particular for forests of the district. There are wild pigeons, quails, green ducks and partridge birds in the fields and lakes.

On the territory of the district, Qusar State Nature Sanctuary was established according to the resolution of the Council of Ministers of Azerbaijan SSR dated February 24, 1964, on an area of 15,000 hectares with the purpose of preserving and increasing the number of animals and birds (pheasant, quail, roe, wild boar, rabbit) inhabiting here.

Population 
According to data of 2007, the population of the rayon consists of  people; 90.63% are Lezgins and 9.06% are the Azerbaijanis. According to the data of 2009, Lezgins are 90.5%, Azerbaijanis are 9.1%, and other nationalities comprise 0.4%. As of 2016, the population of the rayon grew to  people. Lezgins constituted 2% of the total population of Azerbaijan in 2009 who commonly settled in Qusar district. National composition was indicated below in accordance with statistics in 2009. 

The urban population in 2017 accounted for 21% and 79% of the district's population lives in the village.

According to the State Statistics Committee, as of 2018, the population of city recorded 97,200 persons, which increased by 15,400 persons (about 18.8 percent) from 81,800 persons in 2000. 48,600 of total population are men, 48,600 are women. More than 26,9 percent of the population (about 26,200 persons) consists of young people and teenagers aged 14–29.

Religion
Muslims 98%

Sports and tourism

Qusar is home to Shahdag Mountain Resort,  one of the biggest ski resorts in Caucasus and Azerbaijan's first and largest winter resort. Tourist facilities also include such recreational areas as "Alpine Gusar", "Star Gusar", "Gayi Bulak", mountain tourism recreation area "Suvar" and Olympic Sports Complex.

Sightseeing 
There are 2 architectural and 46 archaeological monuments in Qusar. The remains of the 13th century fortress in the village of Anigh, the Shaykh Junayd Mausoleum built in 1544 in the village of Hazra (Yargun), are protected by the government as significant architectural monuments of the country. There are also Kohne Khudat and Huray mosques, belonging to the 18th century, Gil, Gyunduzgala and Hasangala mosques, belonging to the 19th century. There is a museum named after Russian poet Mikhail Lermontov.

Education 
There are 48 secondary schools, 86 general-education schools, 4 non-formal and 13 pre-school education facilities.

In addition, 3 large sports facilities are functioning in Gusar district: Olympic Sports Complex, Central Stadium named after Shovkat Ordukhanov, Children and Youth Sports School.

Economy 
Agriculture is a basis of the region's economy. Agriculture of this region is based on two main fields – crop production and animal husbandry.

Wheat, barley, corn, beans, potatoes, apples, pears, nuts, tomatoes and cabbage are the main crops grown in Qusar. There are more than 5000 hectares of fruit gardens. Nearly 68% of these gardens constitute apple gardens. In order to keep the fruits, cold storage rooms in Chubuglu village (capacity of 4000 tons), Samur settlement (800 tons) and in Yeni Hayat village (2000 tons) were built with governmental support.

Health-care 
There are 3 hospital establishments, 19 health posts, 38 medical centres and 61 medical institutions in the Qusar district.

Honorable residents 
Heroes of the Soviet Union:
 Mirza Valiyev
 Adil Guliyev

Administrative structure 
There is 1 city (Qusar), 1 settlement (Samur) and 88 villages in the district which has a territory of 1542 km2. Some of the villages are Anig, Laza, Uzdenoba, Gyunduzkala, Duztahir, Zindanmurug, Suvadzhal, Hiloba, Urva, Chilegir and Yukhary Leger.

The current head of the raion's executive power is Shair Alkhanov since 2007. Under the head of the executive authority, there is acted Council consisted of thirteen members. Villages are controlled by overall 29 municipalities.

References

External links 
 www.kycap.com
 Lezgi Informational Entertainment Port--- www.zilezgi.narod.ru

 
Districts of Azerbaijan